The Matrimonial Homes Act 1967 (c. 75) was an Act of the Parliament of the United Kingdom designed to reverse the House of Lords decision in National Provincial Bank Ltd v Ainsworth [1965] AC 1175, where it ruled that a deserted wife had no right to stay in the family home.

Background and Act
Under Lord Denning's decision in Bendall v McWhirter [1952] 2 QB 466, a deserted wife occupying the marital home had a personal licence to stay there. The decision provoked disapproval among the judiciary and from the public; a correspondent wrote:

The House of Lords effectively nullified Denning's work with the case National Provincial Bank Ltd v Ainsworth [1965] AC 1175 in 1965, which ruled that the deserted wife had no licence to stay. The Act was primarily aimed at reversing this decision, and to this end it states that where one person has the right to occupy a property and his spouse does not, the spouse can occupy the property if it has been used as the marital home. The spouse can only be evicted with a court order, and the court can grant her the right to occupy the house if she is not in occupation at the time of the desertion. This state of affairs can continue until the marriage ceases to subsist, either by divorce or by the death of the partner with the property right. The Act was given royal assent on 27 July 1967. It was repealed by the Matrimonial Homes Act 1983 and the County Courts Act 1984.

References

Bibliography

United Kingdom Acts of Parliament 1967
Repealed United Kingdom Acts of Parliament